{{Speciesbox
| image = Whipray mandalay bay3.jpg
| status = EN
| status_system = IUCN3.1
| status_ref = 
| genus = Maculabatis
| species = gerrardi
| authority = (Gray, 1851)
| synonyms = *Trygon gerrardi J. E. Gray, 1851
Trygon macrurus Bleeker, 1852
Dasyatis gerrardi (Gray, 1851)
Himantura gerrardi (Gray, 1851)
Himantura gerrardii (Gray, 1851)
Trygon liocephalus]] Klunzinger, 1871
}}

The whitespotted whipray or sharpnose stingray (Maculabatis gerrardi'') is a species of stingray in the family Dasyatidae. It is found in coastal regions including estuaries, in the Indo-Pacific, and has also been recorded in the Ganges River. It reaches a maximum length of 2 metres (6½ ft). As presently defined, it is probably a species complex.

Etymology
The Stingray is named in honor of Edward Gerrard (1810-1910), a taxidermist at the British Museum  of Natural History, who with his shark and ray identifications assisted Gray.

References

Last, P.R. and L.J.V. Compagno, 1999. Dasyatididae. Stingrays. p. 1479-1505. In K.E. Carpenter and V.H. Niem (eds.) FAO species identification guide for fishery purposes. The living marine resources of the Western Central Pacific. Vol. 3. Batoid fishes, chimaeras and bony fishes part 1 (Elopidae to Linophrynidae). FAO, Rome. 

Maculabatis
Fish described in 1851
Taxa named by John Edward Gray